Mariano Que was a Chinese Filipino businessman best known for being the founder of the pharmacy chain Mercury Drug.

Background
Born in 1921, Que worked as an employee at Farmacia Central, a major pharmacy owned by Jose Tee Han Kee along Calle Rosario (now Quintin Paredes Street) in Manila, prior to the onset of World War II. He was orphaned during the Japanese occupation of the Philippines.

After the war ended in 1945, Que bought -worth of Sulfathiazole pills. He sold these drugs in single doses and using his savings decided to buy an assortment of medicine which he later peddled through a pushcart. He would eventually found Mercury Drug in Bambang on March 1, 1945. Mercury Drug would open its second store in 1963. In 1972, Mercury would acquire the Tropical Hut fast-food and supermarket chain.

Mercury expanded outside Metro Manila with the acquisition of Medical Center Drug Corporation, a medical supplies and equipment manufacturer, in 1976.

Que's daughter Vivian Azcona, would take over Mercury and become company president, following Que's retirement.

Death
Que died on April 14, 2017, at age 96.

Personal life
Que was married to Estelita de Jesus and had 8 children.

References

1921 births
2017 deaths
Filipino business executives
Filipino company founders
Filipino people of Chinese descent